Staff augmentation is an outsourcing strategy that is used to staff a project and respond to the business objectives. The technique consists of evaluating the existing staff and then determining which additional skills are required. One possible advantage of this approach is that it may leverage existing resources as well as utilize outsourced services and contract workers.

The goal of the exercise is to handle staffing requirements with an existing set of talents. Numerous consulting companies offer staff augmentation services. It has been estimated that staff augmentation as an industry will reach $45 billion in 2015.

The trend in staff augmentation is occurring because of the abundance of IT resources, declining rates, and narrowing margins for companies that need these services.

IT staff augmentation services entail the allocation of dedicated technical resources, usually offshore, hired as overseas development extensions of in-house application development teams on fixed or flexible terms and conditions. This is a service where the provider will augment the client's workforce with skilled persons. The Client is still responsible to manage the persons and the work which they will be completing. The software developers are hired based on their technological skillset. Using IT staff augmentation services provide a one-window solution to companies who might require application development across diverse technology verticals.

See also 
 Body shopping
 Staffing
 Recruitment

References 

Organizational theory